The Battle of Liaskowa took place 9 November 1812 near the village of Liaskowa, where 3,500 Cossacks under Vasily Orlov-Denisov defeated 2,000 soldiers of the Grande Armée under Augereau.

Background
Mikhail Kutuzov in his Attrition warfare against Napoleon had increased the guerrilla warfare of the Cossacks and the people's war of the peasants thereby slowly weakening the French army. During the retreat of the Grande Armée from Moscow to Poland Kutuzov with his main army avoided following Napoleon directly. Kutuzov escorted the Grande Armée on parallel roads in unspoilt regions of the south.

Battle 
3,500 Cossacks under Vasily Orlov-Denisov defeated 2,000 soldiers of the Grande Armée under Augereau.

Aftermath 
The Grande Armée had its next major fight in the Battle of Krasnoi.

See also
List of battles of the French invasion of Russia

References

Literature

External links
 

Battles of the French invasion of Russia
Battles of the Napoleonic Wars
Battles involving Russia
Battles involving France
Conflicts in 1812
November 1812 events
19th century in the Russian Empire
1812 in the Russian Empire